Sugar Colt is a 1966 Italian and Spanish Spaghetti Western directed by Franco Giraldi, produced by Franco Cittadini and Stenio Fiorentini, written by Sandro Continenza, Augusto Finocchi, Giuseppe Mangione and Fernando Di Leo, composed by Luis Enríquez Bacalov, filmed by Alejandro Ulloa and starred by Jack Betts, Joaquín Parra, Soledad Miranda, Georges Rigaud, Antonio Padilla, Giuliano Raffaelli and Hunt Powers. It is the Giraldi's second film after Seven Guns for the MacGregors. The film represents the cinematographical debut for Jack Betts, here credited as Hunt Powers, and it is also Erno Crisa's last film.

Plot
Rocco – also called the man with two faces – is visited by Pinkerton, who wants him to investigate the disappearance, and possible kidnapping, of some soldiers. Rocco declines, as he has a good life teaching women self-defence. When Pinkerton is assassinated, Rocco changes his mind and goes to Snake Valley disguised as a doctor. He uses narcotic gas to loosen the tongues, and gets help from a sidekick and two women at the saloon. He is disclosed and heavily beaten, but eventually frees the hostages, while the responsible big boss gets killed.

Cast

Production

Filming 
It was filmed in Tabernas, in the town of El Fraile, in the lodge Los Arcos and in Almería.

Music 
With his modernist sheet music, Luis Bacalov created the characters of Sugar Colt, Django, I quattro del pater noster, Chapaqua, Lo chiamavano King and The Man Called Noon.

Reception
Sugar Colt was generally well received by critics, and Tullio Kezich defined it as a "little masterpiece". Over 40 years after it was made, Sugar Colt was screened at the 2007 Venice Film Festival in a Spaghetti Western retrospective. Director Franco Giraldi and star Jack Betts were in attendance.

In his investigation of narrative structures in Spaghetti Western films, Fridlund ranges Sugar Colt among Spaghetti Westerns heavily influenced by secret-agent films, because the hero is shown in company with beautiful women, works to uncover a mystery and - unlike the protagonists in A Fistful of Dollars and Django -  does not have any complicating secondary motive.

References

Bibliography

External links

1967 films
English-language Italian films
Spaghetti Western films
Films directed by Franco Giraldi
1967 Western (genre) films
Films scored by Luis Bacalov
Films scored by Ennio Morricone
Films shot in Almería
Cultural depictions of Allan Pinkerton
1960s English-language films
1960s Italian films